is a Japanese family comedy drama starring Ryosuke Yamada, Haru, and Yukiyoshi Ozawa. It was first broadcast on January 13, 2018 on Nippon TV.

Plot
The story revolves around the Kitazawa family. The father, Taizo, is a bestselling writer who owns a private middle school, and is about to open a high school in 3 years. All of his children are Tokyo University graduates: The eldest son, Hirofumi, is a genius surgeon, the only daughter, Chiaki, is a competent lawyer, and the youngest son, Shusaku, is a police detective. While maintaining their 'perfect' family, the siblings try to cover up every single problem that comes at them.

Cast
Ryosuke Yamada as 
Shusaku is the main character and narrator of the story. The youngest son of the family, he is 25 years old. Being a police officer, Shusaku is sometimes conflicted whether to help his family or stay with his professionalism as a law enforcer. He became a police officer because his siblings recommended it, because according to Hirofumi, surgeon, lawyer, and police officer are seen as popular jobs among housewives. His mother died when he was 5 years old.
Yamada commented that Shusaku is a kind of person who always hides his emotion and has the lowest position of the family, being the youngest.
Haru as 
The only daughter of the family, Chiaki is 27 years old. She is a lawyer who has a great sense of justice and will not stay still if someone stained her family. She has a bit tendency of being a sadistic.
Haru commented that Chiaki will not admit if she's wrong and is serious even in odd situations.
Yukiyoshi Ozawa as 
Hirofumi is the oldest son; he is 38 years old. A genius surgeon who is rumored to inherit the hospital's director position. He is actually a narcissistic. 
Ozawa commented that while he does love his family, Hirofumi's narcissistic personality making him a bit of a shifty character.
Nozomu Kotaki as 
Shusaku's junior and a part of Special Investigation Team at Metropolitan Police Department; he is 24 years old. A pro negotiator.
Yuri Tsunematsu as 
A female police officer whom Shusaku has crush on. She is 23 years old.
Kazuya Kojima as 
40 years old. Laundry man whose one of customer is the Kitazawa household.
Yudai Chiba as 
An apprentice butler of the Kitazawa family. He is 27 years old.
Kazuyuki Asano as 
A butler of the Kitazawa family. He is 58 years old.
Baijaku Nakamura as 
The father of the Kitazawa family, he is 63 years old. A bestseller writer and headmaster of Kitazawa Private Middle School.

Staff
Screenplay: Shigeki Kaneko
Theme song:  by Hey! Say! JUMP
Executive Producer: Atsushi Fukushi
Producer: Hiroko Hazeyama, Takashi Akimoto
Director: Satoru Nakajima
Production Cooperation: Office Cresendo
Production work: Nippon TV

Episodes

References

External links
  

2018 Japanese television series debuts
2018 Japanese television series endings
Japanese drama television series
Nippon TV dramas